Veeramangalam  is a village in the  
Avadaiyarkoilrevenue block of Pudukkottai district, Tamil Nadu, India.

Known for
Village Cooking Channel

Demographics 

As per the 2001 census, Veeramangalam had a total population of  
1807 with 824 males and 983 females. Out of the total population 953 people were literate.

References

Villages in Pudukkottai district